Chacalluta International Airport  is an airport serving the city of Arica, capital of the Arica Province in the northern Arica y Parinacota Region of Chile.

Runway 02 has an additional  displaced threshold.

The Arica VOR-DME (Ident: ARI) and non-directional beacon (Ident: R) are located on the approach path to Runway 02.

Airlines and destinations

See also

Transport in Chile
List of airports in Chile

References

External links
Chacalluta Airport at OpenStreetMap

Chacalluta Airport at FallingRain

Airports in Chile
Buildings and structures in Arica y Parinacota Region
Buildings and structures in Arica
Transport in Arica y Parinacota Region